This is a list of film music awards.

By category

Best film music
 BAFTA Award for Best Film Music
 César Award for Best Original Music
 Golden Arena for Best Film Music
 Golden Calf for Best Music
 Golden Goblet Award for Best Music
 Los Angeles Film Critics Association Award for Best Music
 Mainichi Film Award for Best Music
 Prix Iris for Best Original Music
 Saturn Award for Best Music

Best composer
 Critics' Choice Award for Best Composer
 European Film Award for Best Composer

Best music director

 Bollywood Movie Award – Best Music Director
 Filmfare Award for Best Music Director
 Filmfare Award for Best Music Director – Tamil
 Filmfare Award for Best Music Director – Telugu
 ITFA Best Music Director Award
 National Film Award for Best Music Direction
 Santosham Best Music Director Award
 Sarasaviya Best Music Direction Award
 Screen Award for Best Music Director

Best score

 AACTA Award for Best Original Music Score
 Academy Award for Best Original Score
 Canadian Screen Award for Best Original Score
 Chicago Film Critics Association Award for Best Original Score
 Dallas–Fort Worth Film Critics Association Award for Best Musical Score
 Academy of Canadian Cinema and Television Award for Best Achievement in Music – Original Score
 Guldbagge Award for Best Original Score
 Golden Globe Award for Best Original Score
 Goya Award for Best Original Score
 Grammy Award for Best Score Soundtrack for Visual Media
 Magritte Award for Best Original Score
 Online Film Critics Society Award for Best Original Score
 David di Donatello for Best Score
 Nastro d'Argento for Best Score
 Washington D.C. Area Film Critics Association Award for Best Score

Best soundtrack
 Africa Movie Academy Award for Best Soundtrack
 Empire Award for Best Soundtrack
 World Soundtrack Academy
 ARIA Award for Best Original Soundtrack, Cast or Show Album
 Grammy Award for Best Compilation Soundtrack for Visual Media

Best song

 Academy Award for Best Original Song
 Black Reel Award for Best Original or Adapted Song
 Black Reel Award for Outstanding Original Song
 Canadian Screen Award for Best Original Song
 Critics' Choice Movie Award for Best Song
 Academy of Canadian Cinema and Television Award for Best Achievement in Music – Original Song
 Golden Globe Award for Best Original Song
 Golden Raspberry Award for Worst Original Song
 Metro Manila Film Festival Award for Best Original Theme Song
 Mnet Asian Music Award for Best OST
 MTV Movie Award for Best Song from a Movie
 Satellite Award for Best Original Song
 Vijay Award for Favourite Song
 World Soundtrack Award for Best Original Song Written Directly for a Film

Best singer
 ITFA Best Female Playback Award
 ITFA Best Male Playback Award
 National Film Award for Best Female Playback Singer
 National Film Award for Best Male Playback Singer
 Odisha State Film Award for Best Singer
 Saturn Award for Best Music

Various
 Georges Delerue Award
 International Film Music Critics Association
 Primetime Emmy Award for Outstanding Main Title Theme Music
 Primetime Emmy Award for Outstanding Music Composition for a Miniseries, Movie, or a Special
 Primetime Emmy Award for Outstanding Music Composition for a Series

Worst music
 Golden Raspberry Award for Worst Musical Score

Music
Lists of music awards